Elena Favilli  (born 3 August 1982) is an Italian bestselling author, speaker, entrepreneur and liberal feminist leader.

Biography

Elena Favilli is the founder and CEO of digital media company Rebel Girls. Favilli is the co-author of the Good Night Stories for Rebel Girls children's books. The books were praised for introducing young girls to real-life role models, like Oprah, J.K. Rowling, Ruth Bader Ginsburg, and Frida Kahlo, while recognizing the achievements of women throughout history.

Before writing Good Night Stories for Rebel Girls, Favilli worked as a journalist. She has written for the Guardian, COLORS Magazine, McSweeney’s, RAI, Il Post, and La Repubblica.

Rebel Girls was founded by Favilli in 2016, with a mission to highlight the lives of important women throughout history. Under Favilli’s direction, Rebel Girls has published 4 additional children’s books. Rebel Girls books have been translated into nearly 50 languages.

Favilli is the creator and executive producer of Good Night Stories for Rebel Girls: The Podcast. Every episode features the story of a woman from Good Night Stories for Rebel Girls, narrated by influential women like Melinda Gates, Priscilla Chan, Jameela Jamil, and Tarana Burke. Season 2 of Good Night Stories for Rebel Girls: The Podcast won the best in Education at the Podcast Awards in 2019.

In November 2020, Rebel Girls published Good Night Stories for Rebel Girls: 100 Immigrant Women Who Changed the World, also written by Favilli.

As of December 2018, Favilli was residing in Los Angeles.

Works 
Good Night Stories for Rebel Girls Volume 1
Good Night Stories for Rebel Girls Volume 2
Good Night Stories for Rebel Girls: 100 Immigrant Women Who Changed the World (October 2020)

References 

Living people
UC Berkeley Graduate School of Journalism alumni
Women chief executives
Italian chief executives
1982 births